Clouds in My Coffee  is a 2004 Singaporean drama film directed by Gallen Mei.

Plot
Three young women are mistreated by the men in their lives.

Reception
Yong Shu Chiang of today rated the film two out of five, stating, "Mostly mediocre acting and a highly-implausable script clouds the film's message about how women are viewed and treated." Sylvia Toh of The New Paper gave the film 1.5 stars out of 5. In his review of the movie, Tay Yek Keak of The Straits Times stated, "its skin-deep expose, easy caricatures and exploitative, abusive situations make them relevant probably to only director Gallen Mei and his clique of pals."

References

2004 films
Singaporean drama films
2000s English-language films